Below a list of all national champions in the women's 100 metres in track and field from several countries since 1970.

Argentina

1970: Elba Martín
1971: Liliana Cragno
1972: Liliana Cragno
1973: Liliana Cragno
1974: Belkis Fava
1975: Beatriz Allocco
1976: Beatriz Allocco
1977: Beatriz Allocco
1978: Beatriz Allocco
1979: Belkis Fava
1980: Adriana Pero
1981: Marisol Besada
1982: Adriana Pero
1983: Andrea Barabino
1984: Mirta Forgione
1985: Deborah Bell
1986: Deborah Bell
1987: Deborah Bell
1988: Laura de Falco
1989: Ana María Comaschi
1990: Denise Sharpe
1991: Anabella von Kesselstatt
1992: Ana María Comaschi
1993: Daniela Lebreo
1994: Daniela Lebreo
1995: Olga Conte
1996: Olga Conte
1997: Olga Conte
1998: Vanesa Vallejos
1999: Verónica Depaoli
2000: Vanesa Wohlgemutt
2001: Vanesa Wohlgemutt
2002: Vanesa Wohlgemutt
2003: Vanesa Wohlgemutt
2004: Vanesa Wohlgemutt
2005: Vanesa Wohlgemutt
2006: Liliana Tantucci

Australia

1970: Raelene Boyle
1971: Raelene Boyle
1972: Raelene Boyle
1973: Raelene Boyle
1974: Denise Robertson
1975: Denise Robertson
1976: Raelene Boyle
1977: Raelene Boyle
1978: Denise Boyd
1979: Denise Boyd
1980: Denise Boyd
1981: Debbie Wells
1982: Helen Davey
1983: Diane Holden
1984: Debbie Wells
1985: Jenny Flaherty & Diane Holden
1986: Diane Holden
1987: Diane Holden
1988: Jane Flemming
1989: Suzanne Broadrick
1990: Jane Flemming
1991: Monique Dunstan
1992: Melinda Gainsford
1993: Melinda Gainsford
1994: Gwen Torrence (USA)
1995: Melinda Gainsford
1996: Cathy Freeman
1997: Melinda Gainsford-Taylor
1998: Melinda Gainsford-Taylor
1999: Lauren Hewitt
2000: Melinda Gainsford-Taylor
2001: Lauren Hewitt
2002: Lauren Hewitt
2003: Sharon Cripps
2004: Gloria Kemasuode (NGR)
2005: Sally McLellan
2006: Sally McLellan
2007: Sally McLellan
2008: Fiona Cullen
2009: Sally McLellan
2010: Melissa Breen
2011: Sally Pearson
2012: Melissa Breen
2013: Toea Wisil
2014: Sally Pearson

Belarus

1992: Natalya Zhuk
1993: Yelena Denishchik
1994: Natalya Vinogradova
1995: Natalya Safronnikova
1996: Natalya Safronnikova
1997: Natalya Safronnikova
1998: Natalya Safronnikova
1999: Natalya Safronnikova
2000: Tatyana Barashko
2001: Aksana Drahun
2002: Yuliya Bartsevich
2003: Alena Neumiarzhitskaya
2004: Aksana Drahun
2005: Natallia Solohub
2006: Alena Neumiarzhitskaya

Belgium

1970: Francine Van Assche
1971: Francine Van Assche
1972: Lea Alaerts
1973: Lea Alaerts
1974: Véronique Colonval
1975: Lea Alaerts
1976: Lea Alaerts
1977: Lea Alaerts
1978: Katrien Hoeree
1979: Lea Alaerts
1980: Lea Alaerts
1981: Liliane Meganck
1982: Liliane Meganck
1983: Karin Verguts
1984: Ingrid Verbruggen
1985: Ingrid Verbruggen
1986: Tonia Oliviers
1987: Ingrid Verbruggen
1988: Ingrid Verbruggen
1989: Ingrid Verbruggen
1990: Anne Carrette
1991: Katrien Maenhout
1992: Valérie Denis
1993: Nancy Callaerts
1994: Sandrine Hennart
1995: Sandrine Hennart
1996: Kim Gevaert
1997: Nancy Callaerts
1998: Kim Gevaert
1999: Kim Gevaert
2000: Kim Gevaert
2001: Kim Gevaert
2002: Kim Gevaert
2003: Kim Gevaert
2004: Kim Gevaert
2005: Kim Gevaert
2006: Kim Gevaert
2007: Kim Gevaert
2008: Olivia Borlée
2009: Olivia Borlée
2010: Olivia Borlée
2011: Hanna Mariën
2012: Anne Zagré
2013: Anne Zagré
2014: Olivia Borlée
2015: Anne Zagré
2016: Olivia Borlée

Brazil

1991: Claudette Alves Pina
1992: Claudette Alves Pina
1993: Cleide Amaral
1994: Cleide Amaral
1995: Cleide Amaral
1996: Lucimar de Moura
1997: Lucimar de Moura
1998: Kátia de Jesus Santos
1999: Lucimar de Moura
2000: Lucimar de Moura
2001: Lucimar de Moura
2002: Kátia de Jesus Santos
2003: Lucimar de Moura
2004: Lucimar de Moura
2005: Lucimar de Moura

Canada

1970: Patty Loverock
1971: Stephanie Berto
1972: Patty Loverock
1973: Marjorie Bailey
1974: Marjorie Bailey
1975: Patty Loverock
1976: Patty Loverock
1977: Margot Howe
1978: Patty Loverock
1979: Angella Taylor
1980: Angella Taylor
1981: Angella Taylor
1982: Angella Taylor
1983: Angella Taylor
1984: Angella Taylor
1985: Angela Bailey
1986: Angella Taylor-Issajenko
1987: Angella Taylor-Issajenko
1988: Angella Taylor-Issajenko
1989: France Gareau
1990: Angela Bailey
1991: Karen Clarke
1992: Angella Taylor-Issajenko
1993: Karen Clarke
1994: Simone Tomlinson
1995: Karen Clarke
1996: Tamara Perry
1997: Philomena Mensah
1998: Philomena Mensah
1999: Philomena Mensah
2000: Esi Benyarku
2001: Venolyn Clarke
2002: Atia Weekes
2003: Erica Witter
2004: Krysha Bailey
2005: Toyin Olupona

Denmark

1970: Birthe Pedersen
1971: Inge Jensen
1972: Inge Voigt
1973: Margit Hansen
1974: ???
1975: Birthe Pedersen
1976: Birthe Pedersen
1977: ???
1978: Dorthe A. Rasmussen
1979: Dorthe A. Rasmussen
1980: ???
1981: Dorthe A. Rasmussen
1982: ???
1983: Dorthe A. Rasmussen
1984: Dorthe A. Rasmussen
1985: Lene Demsitz
1986: Lene Demsitz
1987: Tine Nielsen
1988: Trine Bogner
1989: Lene Demsitz
1990: Wendy Slatanach (USA)
1991: Lisbeth Larsen
1992: Karen Gydesen
1993: Christina Schnohr
1994: Camilla Voigt
1995: Christina Schnohr
1996: Christina Schnohr
1997: Christina Schnohr
1998: Christina Schnohr
1999: Christina Schnohr
2000: Christina Schnohr
2001: Sille Søndergård
2002: Christina Schnohr
2003: Rikke Sørensen
2004: Rikke Sørensen
2005: Sabrina Søndergaard
2006: Maria Severin

Estonia

1927: Sara Teitelbaum
1928: Sara Teitelbaum
1929: Sara Teitelbaum
1930: Sara Teitelbaum
1931: Sara Teitelbaum
1932: Taimo Kelder
1933: Gertrud Labrik
1934: Taimo Kelder
1935: Ilse Uus
1936: Henriette Israel
1937: Ilse Uus
1938: Ilse Uus
1939: Ilse Uus
1940: Ilse Uus
1941: -
1942: Karin Aviste
1943: Laine Hein
1944: Laine Hein
1945: Eugenia Laasik
1946: Eugenia Laasik
1947: Eugenia Laasik
1948: Eugenia Laasik
1949: Helve Karilaid
1950: Juta Sandbank
1951: Juta Sandbank
1952: Liivia Pütsepp
1953: Salme Tornius
1954: Liivia Pütsepp
1955: Salme Tornius
1956: Liivia Pütsepp
1957: Salme Tornius
1958: Liivia Härsing
1959: Liivia Härsing
1960: Liivia Härsing
1961: Liivia Härsing
1962: Liivia Härsing
1963: Liivia Härsing
1964: Tamara Palm
1965: Helgi Mägi
1966: Helgi Mägi
1967: Helle Volmer
1968: Hilju Lillo
1969: Helgi Mägi
1970: Marion Piisang
1971: Tiina Torop
1972: Galina Pavlova
1973: Tiina Torop
1974: Galina Schneider
1975: Irina Stehhina
1976: Taisi Pihela
1977: Sirje Põldma
1978: Merike Õunpuu
1979: Aili Alliksoo
1980: Saima Tiik
1981: Taimi Loov
1982: Saima Tiik
1983: Tatjana Petruškevitš
1984: Helle Kruuse
1985: Irina Vassiljeva
1986: Taimi Kõnn
1987: Irina Vassiljeva
1988: Riina Suhotskaja
1989: Riina Suhotskaja
1990: Riina Suhotskaja
1991: Anu Kaljurand
1992: Anu Kaljurand
1993: Rutti Luksepp
1994: Milena Alver
1995: Milena Alver
1996: Kertu Tiitso
1997: Rutti Luksepp
1998: Rutti Luksepp
1999: Rutti Luksepp
2000: Marianna Voronina
2001: Katrin Käärt
2002: Katrin Käärt
2003: Kadri Viigipuu
2004: Katrin Käärt
2005: Katrin Käärt
2006: Ksenija Balta
2007: Ksenija Balta
2008: Ksenija Balta
2009: Anita Maksimova
2010: Grit Šadeiko
2011: Grit Šadeiko
2012: Maarja Kalev
2013: Ksenija Balta
2014: Maarja Kalev
2015: Maarja Kalev
2016: Ksenija Balta
2017: Maarja Kalev
2018: Õilme Võro
2019: Õilme Võro
2020: Ksenija Balta
2021: Karoli Käärt
2022: Ann Marii Kivikas

Finland

1970: Mona-Lisa Strandvall
1971: Tuula Rautanen
1972: Tuula Rautanen
1973: Mona-Lisa Pursiainen
1974: Mona-Lisa Pursiainen
1975: Mona-Lisa Pursiainen
1976: Mona-Lisa Pursiainen
1977: Mona-Lisa Pursiainen
1978: Helinä Laihorinne
1979: Helinä Laihorinne
1980: Riita Vesanen
1981: Helinä Laihorinne
1982: Helinä Laihorinne
1983: Helinä Marjamaa
1984: Helinä Marjamaa
1985: Sisko Markkanen
1986: Sisko Markkanen
1987: Auli Marttinen
1988: Sisko Hanhijoki
1989: Sisko Hanhijoki
1990: Sisko Hanhijoki
1991: Sisko Hanhijoki
1992: Sisko Hanhijoki
1993: Sanna Hernesniemi
1994: Sanna Hernesniemi
1995: Sanna Hernesniemi
1996: Sanna Hernesniemi
1997: Sanna Hernesniemi
1998: Sanna Kyllönen
1999: Sanna Kyllönen
2000: Heidi Hannula
2001: Johanna Manninen
2002: Johanna Manninen
2003: Johanna Manninen
2004: Johanna Manninen
2005: Heidi Hannula
2006: Heidi Hannula
2007: Johanna Manninen
2008: Sari Keskitalo
2009: Sari Keskitalo
2010: Sari Keskitalo
2011: Ella Räsänen
2012: Hanna-Maari Latvala
2013: Hanna-Maari Latvala
2014: Hanna-Maari Latvala

France

1970: Sylviane Telliez
1971: Sylviane Telliez
1972: Sylviane Telliez
1973: Sylviane Telliez
1974: Sylviane Telliez
1975: Sylviane Telliez
1976: Chantal Réga
1977: Annie Alizé
1978: Chantal Réga
1979: Chantal Réga
1980: Chantal Réga
1981: Rose-Aimée Bacoul
1982: Rose-Aimée Bacoul
1983: Rose-Aimée Bacoul
1984: Marie-France Loval
1985: Marie-Christine Cazier
1986: Laurence Bily
1987: Laurence Bily
1988: Laurence Bily
1989: Laurence Bily
1990: Laurence Bily
1991: Marie-José Pérec
1992: Laurence Bily
1993: Valérie Jean-Charles
1994: Odiah Sidibé
1995: Odile Singa
1996: Odiah Sidibé
1997: Frédérique Bangué
1998: Frédérique Bangué
1999: Katia Benth
2000: Christine Arron
2001: Frédérique Bangué
2002: Sylviane Félix
2003: Christine Arron
2004: Christine Arron
2005: Sylvie Mballa Eloundou
2006: Véronique Mang
2007: Carima Louami
2008: Carima Louami
2009: Myriam Soumaré
2010: Véronique Mang
2011: Ruddy Zang-Milama (GAB)

Germany

East Germany

1970: Renate Meissner
1971: Renate Stecher
1972: Evelin Kaufer
1973: Renate Stecher
1974: Renate Stecher
1975: Renate Stecher
1976: Monika Meyer
1977: Marlies Oelsner
1978: Marlies Göhr
1979: Marlies Göhr
1980: Marlies Göhr
1981: Marlies Göhr
1982: Marlies Göhr
1983: Marlies Göhr
1984: Marlies Göhr
1985: Marlies Göhr
1986: Silke Gladisch
1987: Silke Gladisch
1988: Marlies Göhr
1989: Katrin Krabbe
1990: Kerstin Behrendt

West Germany

1970: Ingrid Mickler
1971: Elfgard Schittenhelm
1972: Elfgard Schittenhelm
1973: Elfgard Schittenhelm
1974: Annegret Richter
1975: Inge Helten
1976: Annegret Richter
1977: Elvira Possekel
1978: Birgit Wilkes
1979: Annegret Richter
1980: Annegret Richter
1981: Monika Hirsch
1982: Resi März
1983: Sabine Klösters
1984: Heidi-Elke Gaugel
1985: Heidi-Elke Gaugel
1986: Heidi-Elke Gaugel
1987: Ulrike Sarvari
1988: Ulrike Sarvari
1989: Ulrike Sarvari
1990: Ulrike Sarvari

Unified Germany

1991: Katrin Krabbe
1992: Heike Drechsler
1993: Melanie Paschke
1994: Melanie Paschke
1995: Melanie Paschke
1996: Melanie Paschke
1997: Andrea Phillipp
1998: Andrea Phillipp
1999: Andrea Phillipp
2000: Esther Möller
2001: Gabi Rockmeier
2002: Sina Schielke
2003: Melanie Paschke
2004: Sina Schielke
2005: Birgit Rockmeier
2006: Verena Sailer
2007: Verena Sailer
2008: Verena Sailer
2009: Verena Sailer
2010: Verena Sailer
2011: Cathleen Tschirch
2012: Verena Sailer
2013: Verena Sailer
2014: Tatjana Pinto
2015: Verena Sailer

Great Britain

1970: Anita Neil
1971: Anita Neil
1972: Della Pascoe
1973: Andrea Lynch
1974: Andrea Lynch
1975: Andrea Lynch
1976: Andrea Lynch
1977: Sonia Lannaman
1978: Kathy Smallwood
1979: Heather Hunte
1980: Kathy Smallwood
1981: Wendy Hoyte
1982: Wendy Hoyte
1983: Kathy Smallwood-Cook
1984: Kathy Smallwood-Cook
1985: Heather Oakes
1986: Paula Dunn
1987: Paula Dunn
1988: Paula Dunn
1989: Paula Dunn
1990: Stephi Douglas
1991: Stephi Douglas
1992: Stephi Douglas
1993: Beverly Kinch
1994: Katharine Merry
1995: Paula Thomas
1996: Stephi Douglas
1997: Donna Fraser
1998: Joice Maduaka
1999: Joice Maduaka
2000: Marcia Richardson
2001: Sarah Wilhelmy
2002: Joice Maduaka
2003: Joice Maduaka
2004: Abiodun Oyepitan
2005: Laura Turner
2006: Joice Maduaka

India

1988: Zenia Ayrton
1989: P.T. Usha
1990: Ashwini Nachappa
1991: Ashwini Nachappa
1992: Zenia Ayrton
1993: Zenia Ayrton
1994: ???
1995: ???
1996: E.B. Shyla
1997: ???
1998: Rachita Mistry
1999: P.T. Usha
2000: Saraswati Dey
2001: Kavitha Pandya
2002: Saraswati Saha
2003: Saraswati Saha
2004: Poonam Tomar
2005: Poonam Tomar

Italy

1927: Luigia Bonfanti
1928: Margherita Scolari
1929: not held
1930: Giovanna Viarengo
1931: Giovanna Viarengo (2)
1932: Claudia Testoni
1933: Ondina Valla 
1934: Fernanda Bullano 
1935: Fernanda Bullano (2)
1936: Ondina Valla (2)
1937: Claudia Testoni (2)
1938: Maria Alfero
1939: Italia Lucchini
1940: Claudia Testoni (3)
1941: Italia Lucchini (2)
1942: Italia Lucchini (3)
1943: Ines Bessanello
1944-1945: not held
1946: Mirella Avalle
1947: Mirella Avalle (2)
1948: Liliana Tagliaferri
1949: Liliana Tagliaferri (2)
1950: Laura Sivi
1951: Vittoria Cesarini
1952: Giuseppina Leone
1953: Giuseppina Leone (2)
1954: Giuseppina Leone (3)
1955: Giuseppina Leone (4)
1956: Giuseppina Leone (5)
1957: Giuseppina Leone (6)
1958: Giuseppina Leone (7)
1959: Giuseppina Leone (8)
1960: Giuseppina Leone (9)
1961: Donata Govoni
1962: Donata Govoni (2)
1963: Donata Govoni (3)
1964: Giovanna Carboncini
1965: Donata Govoni (4)
1966: Donata Govoni (5)
1967: Donata Govoni (6)
1968: Cecilia Molinari
1969: Donata Govoni (7)
1970: Cecilia Molinari (2)
1971: Cecilia Molinari (3)
1972: Cecilia Molinari (4)
1973: Cecilia Molinari (5)
1974: Cecilia Molinari (6)
1975: Rita Bottiglieri
1976: Rita Bottiglieri (2)
1977: Rita Bottiglieri (3)
1978: Laura Miano
1979: Laura Miano (2)
1980: Marisa Masullo
1981: Marisa Masullo (2)
1982: Marisa Masullo (3)
1983: Marisa Masullo (4)
1984: Marisa Masullo (5)
1985: Marisa Masullo (6)
1986: Rossella Tarolo
1987: Marisa Masullo (7)
1988: Marisa Masullo (8)
1989: Sonia Vigati
1990: Marisa Masullo (9)
1991: Marisa Masullo (10)
1992: Marisa Masullo (11)
1993: Giada Gallina
1994: Giada Gallina (2)
1995: Giada Gallina (3)
1996: Maria Ruggeri
1997: Giada Gallina (4)
1998: Elena Sordelli
1999: Manuela Levorato
2000: Francesca Cola
2001: Manuela Levorato (2)
2002: Manuela Levorato (3)
2003: Daniela Graglia
2004: Vincenza Calì
2005: Vincenza Calì (2)
2006: Elena Sordelli (2)
2007: Anita Pistone
2008: Anita Pistone (2)
2009: Anita Pistone (3)
2010: Manuela Levorato (4)
2011: Ilenia Draisci
2012: Audrey Alloh
2013: Gloria Hooper 
2014: Irene Siragusa 
2015: Gloria Hooper 
2016: Gloria Hooper 
2017: Irene Siragusa 
2018: Johanelis Herrera

Jamaica

1983: Lelieth Hodges
1984: Grace Jackson
1985: ???
1986: Camille Coates
1987: Vivienne Spence
1988: Merlene Ottey
1989: Andria Lloyd
1990: Juliet Campbell
1991: Merlene Ottey
1992: Juliet Cuthbert
1993: Merlene Ottey
1994: Dahlia Duhaney
1995: Merlene Ottey
1996: Merlene Ottey
1997: Merlene Ottey
1998: Beverly McDonald
1999: Peta-Gaye Dowdie
2000: Peta-Gaye Dowdie
2001: Aleen Bailey
2002: Veronica Campbell
2003: Aleen Bailey
2004: Veronica Campbell
2005: Veronica Campbell
2006: Sherone Simpson
2007: Veronica Campbell
2008: Kerron Stewart
2009: Shelly-Ann Fraser
2010: Sherone Simpson
2011: Veronica Campbell-Brown
2012: Shelly-Ann Fraser-Pryce
2013: Kerron Stewart
2014: Veronica Campbell-Brown
2015: Shelly-Ann Fraser-Pryce
2016: Elaine Thompson
2017: Elaine Thompson
2018: Elaine Thompson
2019: Elaine Thompson
2021: Shelly-Ann Fraser-Pryce
2022: Shericka Jackson

Japan
The information taken from JAAF website.
1970: Keiko Yamada
1971: Keiko Yamada
1972: Keiko Yamada
1973: Keiko Yamada
1974: Emiko Konishi
1975: Yukiko Osako
1976: Yukiko Osako
1977: Emiko Konishi
1978: Keiko Yamada
1979: Sumiko Kaibara
1980: Yukiko Osako
1981: Hiromi Isozaki
1982: Emiko Konishi
1983: Emiko Konishi
1984: Emiko Konishi
1985: Emiko Konishi
1986: Emiko Konishi
1987: Mikako Eguchi
1988: Etsuko Hara
1989: Toshie Kitada
1990: Madoka Miki
1991: Pauline Davis
1992: Ayako Nomura
1993: Ayako Nomura
1994: Toshie Kitada
1995: Toshie Kitada
1996: Toshie Kitada
1997: Kaori Yoshida
1998: Motoko Arai
1999: Motoko Arai
2000: Motoko Arai
2001: Motoko Arai
2002: Motoko Arai
2003: Motoko Arai
2004: Motoko Kojima & Kaori Sakagami
2005: Tomoko Ishida
2006: Sakie Nobuoka
2007: Momoko Takahashi
2008: Chisato Fukushima
2009: Momoko Takahashi
2010: Chisato Fukushima
2011: Chisato Fukushima
2012: Chisato Fukushima
2013: Chisato Fukushima
2014: Chisato Fukushima
2015: Chisato Fukushima
2016: Chisato Fukushima
2017: Kana Ichikawa
2018: Nodoka Seko
2019: Midori Mikase

Latvia

1991: Marina Smirnova
1992: Ludmila Olijara
1993: Ludmila Olijara
1994: Ludmila Olijara
1995: Valentīna Gotovska
1996: Alina Novikova
1997: Jelena Savilova
1998: Jelena Savilova
1999: Inese Petruna
2000: Zanda Grava
2001: Margarita Bondarenko
2002: Inese Petruna
2003: Anita Kozica
2004: Anita Kozica
2005: Olga Mirzagitova
2006: Zanda Grava
2007: ???
2008: Ieva Zunda
2009: Jekaterina Čekele
2010: Jekaterina Čekele

Lithuania

1990: Ilona Karopcikiené
1991: Ilona Karopcikiené
1992: Ilona Karopcikiené
1993: Audroné Mockeviciûté
1994: Dina Makarenko
1995: Agné Visockaité
1996: Agné Visockaité
1997: Agné Visockaité
1998: Agné Visockaité
1999: Audra Dagelyté
2000: Audra Dagelyté
2001: Audra Dagelyté
2002: Agné Visockaité
2003: Agné Eggerth
2004: Agné Eggerth
2005: Audra Dagelyté
2006: Lina Grinčikaitė
2007: Audra Dagelyté
2008: Lina Grinčikaitė
2009: Lina Grinčikaitė
2010: Lina Grinčikaitė

Netherlands

1970: Wilma van den Berg
1971: Wilma van den Berg
1972: Wilma van Gool
1973: Elly van Lienen
1974: Wilma van Gool
1975: Mieke van Wissen
1976: Wilma van Gool
1977: Elly Henzen
1978: Elly Henzen
1979: Els Vader
1980: Els Vader
1981: Els Vader
1982: Els Vader
1983: Nelli Cooman
1984: Els Vader
1985: Nelli Cooman
1986: Nellie Fiere-Cooman
1987: Claudia Ellissen
1988: Nellie Fiere-Cooman
1989: Marjan Olyslager
1990: Nellie Fiere-Cooman
1991: Nelli Cooman
1992: Nelli Cooman
1993: Jacqueline Poelman
1994: Jacqueline Poelman
1995: Jacqueline Poelman
1996: Mami Awuah Asante
1997: Jacqueline Poelman
1998: Mami Awuah Asante
1999: Jacqueline Poelman
2000: Jacqueline Poelman
2001: Jacqueline Poelman
2002: Jacqueline Poelman
2003: Jacqueline Poelman
2004: Joan van den Akker
2005: Jacqueline Poelman
2006: Jacqueline Poelman
2007: Pascal van Assendelft
2008: Femke van der Meij
2009: Jamile Samuel
2010: Femke van der Meij
2011: Dafne Schippers
2012: Dafne Schippers
2013: Madiea Ghafoor
2014: Dafne Schippers
2015: Dafne Schippers
2016: Naomi Sedney

New Zealand

1970: Penny Hunt
1971: Wendy Urquhart
1972: Brenda Matthews
1973: Wendy Brown
1974: Wendy Brown
1975: Penny Hunt
1976: Sue Jowett
1977: Kim Robertson
1978: Kim Robertson
1979: Kim Robertson
1980: Kim Robertson
1981: Wendy Brown
1982: Kim Robertson
1983: Kim Robertson
1984: Andrea Wade
1985: Andrea Wade
1986: Bev Peterson
1987: Andrea Wade
1988: Bev Peterson
1989: Bev Peterson
1990: Briar Toop
1991: Michelle Seymour
1992: Michelle Seymour
1993: Michelle Seymour
1994: Michelle Seymour
1995: Chantal Brunner
1996: Chantal Brunner
1997: Jane Arnott
1998: Jane Arnott
1999: Caro Hunt
2000: Caro Hunt
2001: Chantal Brunner
2002: Caro Hunt
2003: Caro Hunt
2004: Chantal Brunner
2005: Chantal Brunner
2006: Chantal Brunner
2007: Monique Williams
2008: Monique Williams
2009: Monique Williams
2010: Anna Smythe
2011: Andrea Koenen
2012: Monique Williams
2013: Mariah Ririnui
2014: Fiona Morrison
2015: Kelsey Berryman
2016: Rochelle Coster

Norway

1970: Tone Svarstad
1971: Eva Seim
1972: Eva Seim
1973: Eva Seim
1974: Nina Liverød
1975: Eva Seim
1976: Turid Bjørkli
1977: Mona Evjen
1978: Mona Evjen
1979: Mona Evjen
1980: Mona Evjen
1981: Mona Evjen
1982: Mona Evjen
1983: Mona Evjen
1984: Mona Evjen
1985: Mette Husbyn
1986: Sølvi Olsen
1987: Mette Husbyn
1988: Sølvi Olsen
1989: Mette Husbyn & Sølvi Olsen
1990: Sølvi Olsen
1991: Sølvi Olsen
1992: Anette Dave
1993: Sølvi Meinseth
1994: Ingvild Larsen
1995: Ingvild Larsen
1996: Marit Nyberg Birknes
1997: Marit Nyberg Birknes
1998: Marit Nyberg Birknes
1999: Sigvor Melve
2000: Ann Helen Rinden
2001: Inger Elisabeth Tørre
2002: Marit Nyberg
2003: Ann Helen Rinden
2004: Anne Cathrine Bakken
2005: Ezinne Okparaebo
2006: Ezinne Okparaebo
2007: Ezinne Okparaebo
2008: Ezinne Okparaebo
2009: Ezinne Okparaebo

Poland

1970: Helena Kerner
1971: Helena Flisnik
1972: Irena Szewińska
1973: Irena Szewińska
1974: Irena Szewińska
1975: Ewa Długolecka
1976: Malgorzata Bogucka
1977: Malgorzata Bogucka
1978: Grazyna Rabsztyn
1979: Irena Szewinska
1980: Zofia Bielcyk
1981: Iwona Pakula
1982: Iwona Pakula
1983: Anna Slipiko
1984: Elżbieta Tomczak
1985: Elżbieta Tomczak
1986: Ewa Kasprzyk
1987: Jolanta Janota
1988: Ewa Pisiewicz
1989: Joanna Smolarek
1990: Joanna Smolarek
1991: Joanna Smolarek
1992: Joanna Smolarek
1993: Dorota Krawczak
1994: Izabela Czajko
1995: Kinga Leszczyńska
1996: Kinga Leszczyńska
1997: Anna Leszczyńska
1998: Kinga Leszczyńska
1999: Zuzanna Radecka
2000: Zuzanna Radecka
2001: Agnieszka Rysiukiewicz
2002: Beata Szkudlarz
2003: Daria Onyśko
2004: Daria Onyśko
2005: Daria Onyśko
2006: Daria Onyśko
2007: Daria Korczyńska
2008: Daria Korczyńska
2009: Marika Popowicz
2010: Weronika Wedler
2011: Marika Popowicz
2012: Daria Korczyńska
2013: Marika Popowicz
2014: Anna Kiełbasińska
2015: Marika Popowicz
2016: Ewa Swoboda
2017: Ewa Swoboda
2018: Ewa Swoboda
2019: Ewa Swoboda

Portugal

1970: Angélica Manaca Dias
1971: Júlia Moisão
1972: Maria José Sobral
1973: Angélica Manaca Dias
1974: Angélica Manaca Dias
1975: Maria José Sobral
1976: Vera Lisa
1977: Vera Lisa
1978: Vera Lisa
1979: Maria João Lopes
1980: Maria João Lopes
1981: Maria João Lopes
1982: Virgínia Gomes
1983: Virgínia Gomes
1984: Vera Lisa
1985: Cláudia Gomes
1986: Virgínia Gomes
1987: Cláudia Gomes
1988: Virgínia Gomes
1989: Virgínia Gomes
1990: Carmo Prazeres
1991: Virgínia Gomes
1992: Virgínia Gomes
1993: Lucrécia Jardim
1994: Carmo Tavares
1995: Sandra Castanheira
1996: Christina Regalo
1997: Lucrécia Jardim
1998: Lucrécia Jardim
1999: Carmo Tavares
2000: Severina Cravid
2001: Severina Cravid
2002: Severina Cravid
2003: Severina Cravid
2004: Rafaela Almeida & Patrícia Lopes
2005: Carla Tavares
2006: Sónia Tavares
2007: Sónia Tavares
2008: Sónia Tavares
2009: Carla Tavares
2010: Carla Tavares
2011: Sónia Tavares
2012: Eva Vital

Russia

1992: Natalya Voronova
1993: Natalya Voronova
1994: Natalya Voronova
1995: Yekaterina Leshchova
1996: Galina Malchugina
1997: Yekaterina Leshchova
1998: Oksana Ekk
1999: Irina Privalova
2000: Natalya Ignatova
2001: Yekaterina Leshchova
2002: Marina Kislova
2003: Yuliya Tabakova
2004: Yuliya Tabakova
2005: Olga Fyodorova
2006: Yekaterina Grigoryeva

Spain

1970: Pilar Fanlo
1971: María Margarita Martínez
1972: Lourdes Valdor
1973: Pilar Fanlo
1974: Ela Cifuentes
1975: Yolanda Oroz
1976: Ela Cifuentes
1977: Yolanda Oroz
1978: Loles Vives
1979: Lourdes Valdor
1980: Lourdes Valdor
1981: Mercedes Cano
1982: Teresa Rioné
1983: Teresa Rioné
1984: Teresa Rioné
1985: Blanca Lacambra
1986: Blanca Lacambra
1987: Yolanda Díaz
1988: Sandra Myers
1989: Yolanda Díaz
1990: Cristina Castro
1991: Cristina Castro
1992: Cristina Castro
1993: Patricia Morales
1994: Cristina Castro
1995: Carme Blay
1996: Cristina Castro
1997: Carme Blay
1998: Arancha Iglesias
1999: Arancha Iglesias
2000: Carme Blay
2001: Carme Blay
2002: Carme Blay
2003: Carme Blay
2004: Arancha Iglesias
2005: 
2006: Belén Recio
2007: Belén Recio
2008: Belén Recio
2009: Digna Luz Murillo
2010: Digna Luz Murillo
2011: Digna Luz Murillo
2012: Concepción Montaner

Sweden

1970: Karin Lundgren
1971: Karin Lundgren
1972: Margaretha Larsson
1973: Margaretha Lövgren
1974: Linda Haglund
1975: Linda Haglund
1976: Linda Haglund
1977: Linda Haglund
1978: Linda Haglund
1979: Linda Haglund
1980: Anne-Louise Skoglund
1981: Linda Haglund
1982: Lena Möller
1983: Lena Möller
1984: Maria Fernström
1985: Maria Fernström
1986: Lena Möller
1987: Maria Fernström
1988: Maria Fernström
1989: Gunilla Ascard
1990: Victoria Ljungberg
1991: Gunilla Ascard
1992: Maria Staafgård
1993: Marika Johansson
1994: Therese Olofsson
1995: Therese Olofsson
1996: Therese Olofsson
1997: Annika Amundin
1998: Jenny Kallur
1999: Annika Amundin
2000: Annika Amundin
2001: Annika Amundin
2002: Jenny Kallur
2003: Carolina Klüft
2004: Carolina Klüft
2005: Susanna Kallur
2006: Daniela Lincoln-Saavedra

Ukraine 

1992: Anzhelika Shevchuk
1993: Irina Slyusar
1994: Zhanna Tarnopolskaya
1995: Zhanna Pintusevich
1996: Iryna Pukha
1997: Anzhela Kravchenko
1998: Anzhela Kravchenko
1999: Anzhela Kravchenko
2000: Anzhela Kravchenko
2001: Anzhela Kravchenko
2002: Anzhela Kravchenko
2003: Olena Pastushenko
2004: Iryna Kozhemyakina
2005: Iryna Shtanhyeyeva
2006: Nataliya Pohrebnyak
2007: Iryna Shtanhyeyeva
2008: Nataliya Pohrebnyak
2009: Nataliya Pohrebnyak
2010: Olesya Povh
2011: Viktoriya Kashcheyeva
2012: Olesya Povh
2013: Nataliya Pohrebnyak
2014: Nataliya Pohrebnyak
2015: Nataliya Pohrebnyak
2016: Nataliya Pohrebnyak
2017: Hanna Plotitsyna
2018: Khrystyna Stuy
2019: Viktoriya Ratnikova
2020: Yana Kachur

United States

 1923: Frances Ruppert
 1924: Frances Ruppert
 1925: Helen Filkey
 1926: Rosa Grosse
 1927: Elta Cartwright
 1928OT: Elta Cartwright
 1929: Betty Robinson
 1930: Stella Walsh
 1931: Eleanor Egg
 1932OT: Wilhelmina von Bremen
 1933: Annette Rogers
 1934: not held
 1935: Helen Stephens
 1936: Helen Stephens
 1937: Claire Isicson
 1938: Lula Hymes
 1939: Olive Hasenfus
 1940: Jean Lane
 1941: Jean Lane
 1942: Alice Coachman
 1943: Stella Walsh
 1944: Stella Walsh
 1945: Alice Coachman
 1946: Alice Coachman
 1947: Juanita Watson
 1948: Stella Walsh
 1949: Jean Patton
 1950: Jean Patton
 1951: Mary McNabb
 1952: Catherine Hardy
 1953: Barbara Jones
 1954: Barbara Jones
 1955: Mae Faggs
 1956: Mae Faggs
 1957: Barbara Jones
 1958: Margaret Mathews
 1959: Wilma Rudolph
 1960: Wilma Rudolph
 1961: Wilma Rudolph
 1962: Wilma Rudolph
 1963: Edith McGuire
 1965: Wyomia Tyus
 1965: Wyomia Tyus
 1966: Wyomia Tyus
 1967: Barbara Ferrell
 1968: Margaret Bailes
 1969: Barbara Ferrell
1970: Chi Cheng (TPE)
1971: Iris Davis
1972: Alice Annum (GHA)
1973: Iris Davis
1974: Renaye Bowen
1975: Rosalyn Bryant
1976: Chandra Cheeseborough
1977: Evelyn Ashford
1978: Lilieth Hodges (JAM)
1979: Evelyn Ashford
1980: Alice Brown
1981: Evelyn Ashford
1982: Evelyn Ashford
1983: Evelyn Ashford
1984: Merlene Ottey (JAM)
1985: Merlene Ottey (JAM)
1986: Pam Marshall
1987: Diane Williams
1988: Sheila Echols
1989: Dawn Sowell
1990: Michelle Finn
1991: Carlette Guidry
1992:OTGwen Torrence
1993: Gail Devers
1994: Gail Devers
1995: Gwen Torrence
1996:OTGwen Torrence
1997: Marion Jones
1998: Marion Jones
1999: Inger Miller
2000:OTMarion Jones
2001: Chryste Gaines
2002: Marion Jones
2003: Torri Edwards
2004:OTLaTasha Colander
2005: Me'Lisa Barber
2006: Marion Jones
2007: Torri Edwards
2008:OTMuna Lee
2009: Carmelita Jeter
2010: Allyson Felix
2011: Carmelita Jeter
2012:OTCarmelita Jeter
 2013: English Gardner
 2014: Tianna Bartoletta
 2015: Tori Bowie
 2016: English Gardner
 2017: Tori Bowie
 2018: Aleia Hobbs
 2019: Teahna Daniels
 2021: Javianne Oliver

References

GBRathletics
Australian Championships
USA Outdoor Track & Field Champions
New Zealand Champions

Women
100 metres
National